Lao Police Club is a football club based in Vientiane, Laos. They were champions of the Lao League in 2012.

Current squad

Invitational tournament record

Honours

Lao Premier League
Winners (1): 2012
 Lao FF Cup:
  Winners(1): 2014

References

External links
 Weltfussballarchiv

Football clubs in Laos
Police association football clubs